Capparidia is a genus of moths of the family Crambidae. It contains only one species, Capparidia ghardaialis, which is found in North Africa.

References

Pyraustinae
Crambidae genera